Paal Frisvold (born 5 May 1962) is a Norwegian organizational leader and retired fencer.

He competed in the team épée event at the 1984 Summer Olympics. In 2009 he was elected as the new leader of the European Movement in Norway, succeeding Svein Roald Hansen.

References

External links
 

1962 births
Living people
Sportspeople from Oslo
Norwegian male épée fencers
Olympic fencers of Norway
Fencers at the 1984 Summer Olympics
Norwegian expatriates in Belgium
20th-century Norwegian people